Kalubhar River is a river on the Kathiawar peninsula in the western India state of Gujarat. Kalubhar river originates near Chamardi Village near Babra and meets Gulf of Khambhat. Its length is 94 km. Kalubhar Dam is situated on this river having 667 km2.

References

 

Rivers of Gujarat
Rivers of India